Allan Devine (born 1988) is an Irish hurler who plays as a left corner-forward for the Westmeath senior team.

References

1988 births
Living people
Castlepollard hurlers
Westmeath inter-county hurlers
Place of birth missing (living people)
Date of birth missing (living people)